In physics, chemistry and biology, a potential gradient is the local rate of change of the potential with respect to displacement, i.e. spatial derivative, or gradient. This quantity frequently occurs in equations of physical processes because it leads to some form of flux.

Definition

One dimension

The simplest definition for a potential gradient F in one dimension is the following:

In the limit of infinitesimal displacements, the ratio of differences becomes a ratio of differentials:

Three dimensions

In three dimensions, Cartesian coordinates make it clear that the resultant potential gradient is the sum of the potential gradients in each direction:

where  are unit vectors in the  directions. This can be compactly written in terms of the gradient operator ,

although this final form holds in any curvilinear coordinate system, not just Cartesian.

This expression represents a significant feature of any conservative vector field , namely  has a corresponding potential .

Using Stokes' theorem, this is equivalently stated as

meaning the curl, denoted ∇×, of the vector field vanishes.

Physics

Newtonian gravitation

In the case of the gravitational field , which can be shown to be conservative, it is equal to the gradient in gravitational potential :

There are opposite signs between gravitational field and potential, because the potential gradient and field are opposite in direction: as the potential increases, the gravitational field strength decreases and vice versa.

Electromagnetism

In electrostatics, the electric field  is independent of time , so there is no induction of a time-dependent magnetic field  by Faraday's law of induction:

which implies  is the gradient of the electric potential , identical to the classical gravitational field:

A time-dependent term must be added:

where  is the electromagnetic vector potential. This last potential expression in fact reduces Faraday's law to an identity.

Fluid mechanics

In fluid mechanics, the velocity field  describes the fluid motion. An irrotational flow means the velocity field is conservative, or equivalently the vorticity pseudovector field  is zero:

This allows the velocity potential to be defined simply as:

Chemistry

In an electrochemical half-cell, at the interface between the electrolyte (an ionic solution) and the metal electrode, the standard electric potential difference is:

where R = gas constant, T = temperature of solution, z = valency of the metal, e = elementary charge, NA = Avogadro constant, and aM+z is the activity of the ions in solution. Quantities with superscript ⊖ denote the measurement is taken under standard conditions. The potential gradient is relatively abrupt, since there is an almost definite boundary between the metal and solution, hence the interface term.

Biology

In biology, a potential gradient is the net difference in electric charge across a cell membrane.

Non-uniqueness of potentials

Since gradients in potentials correspond to physical fields, it makes no difference if a constant is added on (it is erased by the gradient operator  which includes partial differentiation). This means there is no way to tell what the "absolute value" of the potential "is" – the zero value of potential is completely arbitrary and can be chosen anywhere by convenience (even "at infinity"). This idea also applies to vector potentials, and is exploited in classical field theory and also gauge field theory.

Absolute values of potentials are not physically observable, only gradients and path-dependent potential differences are.

Potential theory

Field equations, such as Gauss's laws for electricity, for magnetism, and for gravity, can be written in the form:

Scalar potential gradients lead to Poisson's equation:

A general theory of potentials has been developed to solve this equation for the potential. The gradient of that solution gives the physical field, solving the field equation.

See also
Tensors in curvilinear coordinates

References

Concepts in physics
Spatial gradient

pl:Gradient potencjału